Robin Sowden-Taylor (born 9 June 1982) is a Welsh international rugby player.

Sowden-Taylor won his first Wales cap in the win over Italy in 2005 as part of the squad that won the Grand Slam that year. He was also a member of the 2008 Grand Slam winning squad.

In the Summer of 2010, Sowden-Taylor left the Cardiff Blues and joined their regional rivals, the Newport Gwent Dragons, despite being heavily linked with the Sale Sharks.

In January 2011 Sowden-Taylor announced his retirement from rugby at the age of 28.

References

External links
 Cardiff Blues player profile
 Newport Gwent Dragons profile
 Wales profile
 RBS 6 Nations profile

1982 births
Living people
Cardiff Rugby players
Commonwealth Games rugby sevens players of Wales
Dragons RFC players
People educated at The Cathedral School, Llandaff
Rugby sevens players at the 2006 Commonwealth Games
Rugby union flankers
Rugby union players from Cardiff
Rugby union strength and conditioning coaches
Wales international rugby union players
Welsh rugby union players